Writers Guild of America strike may refer to:

1960 Writers Guild of America strike
1981 Writers Guild of America strike
1988 Writers Guild of America strike
2007–2008 Writers Guild of America strike